The 1987 World Archery Championships was the 34th edition of the event. It was held in Adelaide, Australia in March 1987 and was organised by World Archery Federation (FITA).

It marked the first time that the competition took a knockout format.

Medals summary

Recurve

Medals table

References

External links
 World Archery website
 Complete results

World Championship
World Archery
World Archery Championships
Sports competitions in Adelaide
International archery competitions hosted by Australia
1980s in Adelaide
March 1987 sports events in Australia